Eshaqabad Rural District is a rural district (dehestan) in Eshaqabad District, Zeberkhan County, Razavi Khorasan province, Iran. At the 2006 census, its population was 10,110, in 2,618 families. The rural district has 21 villages.

References 

Rural Districts of Razavi Khorasan Province
Nishapur County